Events in the year 2001 in Spain.

Incumbents
 Monarch: Juan Carlos I
 Prime Minister: José María Aznar López

Events

February
 5: Endesa and Iberdrola, two electrical companies announce that the merger process that began in October 2000 has stopped and will not be finalized. 
 11: 7 Technicians of the Compañía Lírica die in a traffic accident.  
 13: Javier Bardem is nominated for an Academy Award for his role in Julian Schnabel's film Before Night Falls, being the first Spanish actor to do so.
 22: Terrorist group ETA execute a car bombing that kills two employees of the company Elektra in San Sebastián.

April
 7: The Partido de Acción Socialista (PASOC) agrees to abandon its federal congress within the United and Alternative Left. 
 23: Madrid is chosen to be a World Book Capital

May
13: The EAJ-PNV/EA coalition (Basque Nationalist Party and Eusko Alkartasuna) attains a great victory during the Basque regional elections, forming a government for the next four years.  Juan José Ibarretxe stays on as president the autonomous community of the Basque Country.

August 
 24: Singer Joaquin Sabina suffered a minor stroke because of excessive drug use that would lead him to the brink of death.
 31: After the death of twelve patients undergoing hemodialysis in Valencia, Madrid and Barcelona, The Department of Pharmacy decides granting a protective detention of a dialyzer marketed by multinational Baxter.

December
 The Orquesta Ciudad de Almería, OCAL (City Orchestra of Almeria) is founded in the Province of Almería,

Arts and entertainment

Sports
 2000–01 La Liga
 2000–01 Segunda División
 2000–01 Copa del Rey
 2001 Vuelta a España

Births

 January 9: Eric García, footballer
 February 11: Bryan Gil, footballer
 April 4: Daniel Aviles, actor

Deaths

See also
 2001 in Spanish television
 List of Spanish films of 2001

References

 
Spain
Years of the 21st century in Spain
Spain
2000s in Spain